The Blonde Vampire is a 1922 American silent drama film directed by Wray Physioc and starring De Sacia Mooers,  Joseph W. Smiley and Miriam Battista.

Cast
 De Sacia Mooers as 	Marcia Saville
 Joseph W. Smiley as 	John Saville
 Charles Craig as 	Simon Downs
 Miriam Battista as Alice
 Robert Conville as 	Jimmy the Rat
 Edwin August as Martin Kent
 Frank Beamish as 	The Chief
 Mildred Wayne as	Lou
 Alfred Barrett as 	Tom Smith, The Snapper

References

Bibliography
 Munden, Kenneth White. The American Film Institute Catalog of Motion Pictures Produced in the United States, Part 1. University of California Press, 1997.

External links
 

1922 films
1922 drama films
American black-and-white films
American silent feature films
Films directed by Wray Physioc
Film Booking Offices of America films
1920s English-language films
1920s American films
Silent American drama films